A sandwich loaf is a stacked savory party entrée made from a loaf of horizontally sliced bread. Typical fillings include egg salad, chicken salad, ham salad, tuna salad, and Cheez Whiz. While rare today, the food was quite popular during the mid 20th century in the United States.

History
Sandwich loaf was mentioned as early as 1935: "[...] giving the fork a chance for active play, the sandwich loaf made its appearance. This loaf, as you all must know by now, is a delicate triple-layered affair generously frosted with creamy cheese. ---"'Breadless Sandwich' is Latest Innovation," Dorothea Duncan, Washington Post, January 27, 1935 (p. S6)

Sandwich Loaf is still common enough to be served in restaurants near the US/Mexico border where the dish is called sandwhichon. This variation is garnished with pineapple, cherries, pickled jalapenos and pecans, and visually resembles a traditional tres leches cake.

Preparation

To create a sandwich loaf, bread is cut horizontally and spread with layers of filling. Common fillings include egg salad, chicken salad, ham salad, tuna salad, and Cheez Whiz. In a simple sandwich loaf, the fillings may all be the same, but in more complex creations each layer is different.

White bread is usually used to create a sandwich loaf, but whole wheat is also used.  Sometimes white and whole wheat are used in alternating layers to create a ribbon effect.  Common garnishes are olives, parsley, grapes, and carrot curls. The loaf is sliced like a cake and eaten with a fork.

See also

 Dagwood sandwich, a tall stacked sandwich
 Sandwich
 Smörgåstårta
 Dressed herring
 Bunny chow
 List of American sandwiches
 List of sandwiches

References
 Casey, Kathy. Retro Food Fiascos: A Collection of Curious Concoctions. Portland: Collectors Press, 2004.
 Crocker, Betty. Betty Crocker's Picture Cook Book. Facsimile ed. Minneapolis: Macmillan USA and General Mills, 1998.
 Doubleday and Company inc. The Pillsbury Cookbook. New York: Doubleday, 1989.
 Lovegren, Sylvia. Fashionable Food: Seven Decades of Food Fads. Chicago: University of Chicago Press, 2005.

External links

 Betty Crocker recipe for sandwich loaf

American sandwiches
Bread dishes